The Turkish Women's Basketball Presidential Cup (Turkish: Kadınlar Cumhurbaşkanlığı Kupası), or Turkish Women's Basketball Super Cup, is the professional basketball women's club super cup competition that takes place each year in Turkey. It usually takes place between the winners of the Turkish Women's Super League and the winners of the Turkish Cup. If the same team wins both the Turkish League and the Turkish Cup in the same season, then the competition takes place between the two league finalists from the Turkish League.

Winners 

Source:

Performance by club

See also 
 Men's
 Turkish Men's's Basketball League  
 Turkish Men's Basketball Cup
 Turkish Men's Basketball Presidential Cup
 Wome's
 Turkish Women's Basketball League
Turkish Women's Basketball Cup
Turkish Women's Basketball Presidential Cup

References 

Cup
Women's basketball cup competitions in Europe
Women
1992 establishments in Turkey